The Caledonian Club is a private club founded in 1891. It is located at 9 Halkin Street SW1, near Belgrave Square, Belgravia, London.

History 
Founded in 1892 as a proprietary club, the Caledonian Club as it is today was formed in 1917 under the leadership of the Marquis Tullibardine. He appealed to Members to make it "the representative national club and headquarters for Scotsmen in London" as well as to those having 'close association' with Scotland, for example, by being born in Scotland, educated in Scotland or having direct Scottish descent. Full membership has been open to women since 2011.

One of the more famous members was John Logie Baird who used the Club to give a private demonstration of his new television system to the Prince of Wales, later briefly King Edward VIII. Baird installed a receiver at the Club and arranged for a special television programme to be sent over from his studio on Long Acre. Other famous members have included Prince Philip, Duke of Edinburgh, Viscount Younger, Sean Connery, Sir Alex Ferguson and William Purves, former Chairman of HSBC.

The Club was located at 33 St James's Square until World War II when it suffered a direct hit during the Blitz.  It then moved from St James's, eventually settling across Green Park into the current clubhouse on Halkin Street, which opened in October 1946 and is named after Halkin Castle, the Duke of Westminster's seat in Flintshire. It was built in 1907 as a private residence of Hugh Morrison to the design of Detmar Blow. A new five-storey wing with a terrace garden was officially opened on St Andrew's Day in 2006 by Queen Elizabeth II.

Societies 

The Club has established various societies:
Members of the Golfing Society play regularly at courses throughout the UK, including Loch Lomond, The Berkshire, Woking, and Archerfield, and on an annual visit to France, usually Le Touquet. A putting contest takes place within the clubhouse at the annual social evening, and guests are tested on their golf knowledge thereafter.
The Racing Society has currently one horse in training, "Fruit Pastille". Members may buy shares in a syndicate or become supporters: they are informed when the horse is racing and have the opportunity to attend races using owners’ and trainers’ facilities.
After lunch at the Club on the first Tuesday of each month, a speaker is invited to talk to The Number 9 Society.
Bridge Society
Snooker Society
The Shooting and Fishing Society hosts numerous events throughout the country, including a highly sociable competition against the New Club, Edinburgh.
The Musical Society organises a series of performances by world-class young musicians in spring and autumn.

See also
List of London's gentlemen's clubs

References

External links
Official website

Gentlemen's clubs in London
1891 establishments in England
Scottish diaspora in Europe
Grade II listed buildings in the City of Westminster
Organizations established in 1891
Belgravia